Balmain Colliery was a coal mine located in Birchgrove in the inner-west of Sydney, in the state of New South Wales, Australia. It produced coal from 1897 until 1931 and natural gas from 1937 to 1950.

Location
The colliery was located on the northern side of the Balmain Peninsula, on the corner of Birchgrove Road and Water Street, next to Birchgrove Public School.

History

The presence of coal was confirmed in 1891 with bores at Birchgrove and Cremorne Point. Permission to mine from the Department of Mines was granted in 1894 with another parcel of land between Rose Bay and Vaucluse also applied for in 1895. Sydney Harbour Collieries (Limited) started the mine, however the company was wound up in 1896; and the mine was bought by the Harbour Collieries Co.

Two shafts, named Birthday and Jubilee, were sunk between 1897 and 1902.

The mine produced coal from 1897 to 1915 and from 1924 to 1931, and methane (natural gas) from 1937 to 1950.

The site is now occupied by the Hopetoun Quays residential complex.

Mining accidents
Three fatal accidents occurred at the mine claiming ten lives:
 On 17 March 1900, six miners were being lowered down the Birthday shaft. At  the bucket they were travelling in caught on a projection, tipped over and five of the six men fell to their death in the shaft. As a result of this accident, the Mining Act was amended to provide guide rails in shafts to prevent bucket swinging or overturning.
 On 23 January 1933, a year after the mine closed, two men were killed in a gas explosion while preparing a drilling site on the 2900' level for an exploratory drill hole to locate methane gas. The coroner concluded that one of the miners struck a match to light his pipe and caused the explosion.
 During the sealing of the Birthday Shaft on 20 April 1945, a rudimentary test was being undertaken which ignited escaping gas and caused an explosion below the seal. The company manager and two men were killed in the accident and another two men injured.

See also

 Mining in Australia
 Coal in Australia

References

Sources
 
 
 
  Primefact 556, 2007.
 

Buildings and structures in Sydney
Coal mines in New South Wales
Mines in New South Wales
Underground mines in Australia
Birchgrove, New South Wales
Tunnels in Sydney
1897 establishments in Australia
1945 disestablishments in Australia